Chat Pile is an American rock band from Oklahoma City, Oklahoma. The band is composed of four members using the pseudonyms Raygun Busch (vocals), Luther Manhole (guitar), Stin (bass), and Cap'n Ron (drums). Their debut album God's Country was released on July 29, 2022.

The band self-identifies as belonging to the noise rock subgenre, but external publications have labeled them as sludge metal.

History 
Chat Pile formed in 2019 and took their name from piles of chat mining, byproducts of lead-zinc mining which are commonly found throughout Northeastern Oklahoma. Their debut EP This Dungeon Earth was released on May 29, 2019. The band performed their first live concert on July 11, 2019 at the venue 89th Street in Oklahoma City. When trying to promote their music, the band was originally rejected by Oklahoma City's music scene. The band found successful promotion when This Dungeon Earth reached the top of Rate Your Music's weekly charts in a fluke of timing. Their second EP Remove Your Skin Please was released on November 15, 2019, and the band released a compilation of both EPs on vinyl and cassette on February 9, 2020.

The Flenser announced the signing of Chat Pile on September 22, 2020. The band released their debut single, "Roots Bloody Roots", a cover of the song by the Brazilian thrash metal band Sepultura from their album Roots, on July 14, 2021. On July 29, 2022, the band released their debut album, God's Country. The album received wide acclaim, receiving the "Best New Music" distinction on Pitchfork.

The band released the soundtrack to the film Tenkiller, which Busch stars in, on November 18, 2022 as a Bandcamp exclusive. The soundtrack was recorded in 2020.

Musical style and influences 
In interviews, the band has described the themes of their music as "trying to capture the anxiety and fear of seeing the world fall apart," and "very consciously try to express and represent the feeling of living in the southern plains." They also take inspiration from other pieces of media including In a Glass Cage, Mysterious Skin, L’Humanite, Henry: Portrait of a Serial Killer, Continental Drift by Russell Banks, and Woman at Point Zero by Nawal El Saadawi. 

The band describes their music as noise rock while acknowledging that audiences have also labeled them as sludge metal. Vocalist and songwriter Raygun Busch named Big Black as "probably our biggest influence." The Flenser describes Chat Pile as "[c]hanneling everything from the oppressive sludgy beat downs of Godflesh, the vulgar absurdity of The Jesus Lizard and the rebellious, post-modern experimentation of Sonic Youth".

According to guitarist Luther Manhole, the band's sound also contains elements of post-punk, nu metal and grunge. Bassist Stin also cites Korn as an influence with "no shame" but is the only member of the band who is a Korn fan. "Most nu-metal is completely unlistenable, especially anything made after 1999," he said.

Busch's vocals are influenced by David Yow of The Jesus Lizard and Scratch Acid, Black Francis of Pixies and H.R. of Bad Brains.

Band members 

 Raygun Busch (Randy Heyer) — vocals
 Luther Manhole (Griff S) — guitar
 Stin (Austin Tackett) — bass
 Cap'n Ron (Aaron Tackett) — drums

Discography

Studio albums 
 God's Country (2022)

Extended plays 
 This Dungeon Earth (2019)
 Remove Your Skin Please (2019)
 Tenkiller Motion Picture Soundtrack (2022)

Singles 
 "Roots Bloody Roots" (2021)
 "Slaughterhouse" (2022)
 "Why" (2022)
 "Wicked Puppet Dance" (2022)

References

External links 
 

2019 establishments in Oklahoma
American noise rock music groups
American sludge metal musical groups
Musical groups from Oklahoma City
Rock music groups from Oklahoma
Musical quartets